The Logan and Albert Advocate was a weekly English language newspaper from Tamborine, Queensland, Australia. The newspaper was published from 1890 to 1908.

History 
Issued on a Saturday, The Logan and Albert Advocate circulated in the regions of Beaudesert, Tamborine, Christmas Creek, Coomera, Pimpama, Nerang Creek, Southport, Beenleigh, Logan Village and throughout the Logan and Albert electorates. The Logan and Albert Advocate was launched at Tamborine on 18 October 1890 and was one of the first newspapers to circulate in the Beaudesert district. The newspaper was printed by W.H. Wendt and Co. for the proprietor Edwin. H. Wildman and was published at the city office of The Logan and Albert Advocate, Stanley Street, South Brisbane, later moving to the corner of Edward and Elizabeth Streets, Brisbane City. The Logan and Albert Advocate enjoyed a large circulation in the Beaudesert district. The newspaper ceased publication in 1908.

Digitisation 
The paper has been digitised as part of the Australian Newspapers Digitisation Program of the National Library of Australia.

See also 
 List of newspapers in Australia

References

External links 
 

Publications established in 1890
Publications disestablished in 1908
Weekly newspapers published in Australia
1890 establishments in Australia
Defunct newspapers published in Queensland
Scenic Rim Region